Giovanna Laurel Dionicio (born 20 September 2001) is an American-raised Dominican footballer who plays as a centre back for college team Yale Bulldogs and the Dominican Republic women's national team.

Early life
Dionicio was raised in West Hartford, Connecticut.

College career
Dionicio has attended the Yale University in New Haven, Connecticut.
She is majoring in biomedical engineering with a focus in biomechanics/mechanobiology.

International career
Dionicio represented the Dominican Republic at the 2020 CONCACAF Women's U-20 Championship. She made her senior debut on 18 February 2021 in a friendly home match against Puerto Rico.

References

2001 births
Living people
Dominican Republic women's footballers
Women's association football central defenders
Dominican Republic women's international footballers
People from West Hartford, Connecticut
Sportspeople from Hartford County, Connecticut
Soccer players from Connecticut
American women's soccer players
Yale Bulldogs women's soccer players
American sportspeople of Dominican Republic descent
African-American women's soccer players
21st-century African-American sportspeople
21st-century African-American women